Christina Aguilera is an American singer. Born in Staten Island, New York, on December 18, 1980, and raised in Rochester, Pennsylvania, she began her career as a child star after appearing in several programs on national television during the nineties, including The Mickey Mouse Club (1993–94). In 1999, after signed with RCA Records, made the transition to pop music with the released of her self-titled debut album, whose spawned three Billboard Hot 100 number-ones singles: "Genie in a Bottle" (1999), "What a Girl Wants" and "Come On Over Baby (All I Want Is You)" (both from 2000). In addition to establishing her as a teen idol, the album earned her prestigious awards, including Female Artist of the Year at the 2000 Billboard Music Awards and Best New Artist at the 2000 Grammy Awards, becoming one of the youngest artists to receive the trophy. In 2000, followed by the release of a Christmas album, My Kind of Christmas, Aguilera promoted her first Spanish-language record, Mi Reflejo, honored with the Latin Grammy Award for Best Female Pop Vocal Album.

For compose the Moulin Rouge! soundtrack, Aguilera collaborated with Lil' Kim, Mýa and Pink in "Lady Marmalade" (2001), whose music video won two trophies in the 2001 MTV Video Music Awards, including Video of the Year. In the following year, she changed her image and artistic direction with Stripped (2002), incorporating a range of musical styles and a more personal lyrical content for its development. Despite sparked controversy, being received with mixed opinions from music critics, the commercial success of the project made her to be considered the female artist of the following year through awards ceremonies, including 2003 MTV Europe Music Awards (EMA). With some tracks extracted from the album such as "Dirrty" featuring Redman, "Beautiful" and "Fighter", she was indicated in several international awards, as Echo Music Prize, Juno Awards and Q Awards.

In her fifth studio album, Back to Basics (2006), Aguilera changed her artistic direction again, for which she was praised by professional critics for her "maturity". With the project, she was nominated in the international female category at the BRIT Awards, being honored with the same prize through ceremonies of the GAFFA Awards and NRJ Music Awards. "Ain't No Other Man" and "Candyman" were the songs of the disc chosen to compete on numerous awards, including Grammy Awards, where the foremore was awarded with the Best Female Pop Vocal Performance. In 2010, she made her cinema debut in Burlesque and collaborated with its soundtrack, with the track "Bound to You" eventually being nominated for the Golden Globe Award for Best Original Song. Posteriorly, Aguilera won other awards in collaboration with Maroon 5 (for "Moves Like Jagger") and A Great Big World (for "Say Something"). Outside of her music works, she owns a line of perfumes with annual releases, for which she has been awarded numerous times at the FiFi Awards, organized by The Fragrance Foundation.

Throughout her career, Aguilera has also accumulated several recognitions; by Rolling Stone and Consequence of Sound lists, she was chosen as one of the greatest vocalists of all time, as well as one of the greatests artists of Latin origin in history by Latina. In addition, she was placed as one of the most important women in the phonographic industry according VH1 and The Independent. In 2013, Aguilera was elected as one of the 100 most influential people in the world by Time; in addition, Billboard magazine developed articles analyzing her influence on the current pop music scene, while she is often cited as a inspiration for several artists. Since then, she has been honoured with multiple lifetime achievement awards in celebration of her impact, including a star on the Hollywood Walk of Fame, a Disney Legend award by The Walt Disney Company, two "Music Icon Awards" at the 47th People's Choice Awards and 31 Nights of Halloween Fan Fest respectively, a "People's Voice Award" at the 39th People's Choice Awards, a special recognition GLAAD award, a "Spirit of Hope Award" at the 2022 Billboard Latin Music Awards and a special recognition award as "The Voice of a Generation" at the 13th ALMA Awards.

Awards and nominations

Other accolades

State honors

Other tributes

World records

Listicles

Notes

References

Bibliography

External links 
 
 
 

A
Aguilera, Christina